Events in the year 1867 in Argentina.

Incumbents
 President: Bartolomé Mitre
 Vice President: Marcos Paz

Governors
 Buenos Aires Province: Adolfo Alsina 
 Mendoza Province:
 until 11 April: Carlos Juan Rodríguez
 11 April-11 July: Nicolás Villanueva 
 11 July-16 October: Ezequiel García 
 starting 16 October: Nicolás Villanueva
 Santa Fe Province: Nicasio Oroño

Vice Governors
Buenos Aires Province: vacant

Events
 27 March – founding of the Club Atlético del Rosario
 9 May – British immigrants Thomas and James Hogg found the Buenos Aires Football Club, effectively marking the beginning of the sport in Argentina.
 8 July – Paraguayan War: Staff Sargeant Roberto A. Chodasiewicz uses an observation balloon during the battle of Humaitá.
 31 October – establishment of the Benito Juárez Partido
 15 November
 La Capital is founded in Rosario, the oldest Argentine newspaper still in circulation.
 Ferrocarril Andino, the first state-owned railway in Argentina, is founded.
 25 November – establishment of the Olavarría Partido

Births
6 January – Pelagio Luna, politician (died 1919)
8 March – Gregorio de Laferrère, politician and playwright (died 1913)
19 April – Elvira Rawson de Dellepiane, first woman in Argentina to obtain a medical degree and "the mother of women's rights in Argentina" (died 1954)

Deaths
2 June – Pascual Echagüe, soldier and politician (born 1797)
5 November – Santiago Derqui

References

 
1860s in Argentina
History of Argentina (1852–1880)
Years of the 19th century in Argentina